The men's 400 metres was an event at the 1928 Summer Olympics in Amsterdam. Fifty athletes from 20 nations competed. NOCs were limited to 4 competitors each. The event was won by Ray Barbuti of the United States, the first title for the Americans in the event since 1912 and the fifth overall. Jimmy Ball won Canada's first medal in the event, a silver.

Background

This was the eighth appearance of the event, which is one of 12 athletics events to have been held at every Summer Olympics. 

None of the finalists from 1924 returned. The world record holder, Emerson Spencer, came in fifth at the U.S. Olympic trials and missed the team. Ray Barbuti won the U.S. trials.

Chile and Greece appeared in the event for the first time. The United States made its eighth appearance in the event, the only nation to compete in it at every Olympic Games to that point.

Competition format

The competition retained the basic four-round format from 1920. The first round had 15 heats, ranging from 2 to 5 athletes. The top two runners in each heat advanced to the quarterfinals. There were 6 quarterfinals of 5 runners each; the top two athletes in each quarterfinal heat advanced to the semifinals. The semifinals featured 2 heats of 6 runners each. The top two runners in each semifinal heat advanced, making a six-man final.

Records

These were the standing world and Olympic records (in seconds) prior to the 1924 Summer Olympics.

No records were set during this event.

Schedule

Results

Round 1

The top two finishers in each of the 15 heats advanced to the quarterfinals.

Heat 1

Heat 2

Heat 3

Heat 4

Heat 5

Heat 6

Heat 7

Heat 8

Heat 9

Heat 10

Heat 11

Heat 12

Heat 13

Heat 14

Heat 15

Quarterfinals

The first two finishers in each of the six heats advanced to the semifinal round.

Quarterfinal 1

Quarterfinal 2

Quarterfinal 3

Quarterfinal 4

Quarterfinal 5

Quarterfinal 6

Semifinals

The first three finishers in each of the two heats advanced to the final.

Semifinal 1

Semifinal 2

Final

References

External links
 Official Report
 Results

4
400 metres at the Olympics
Men's events at the 1928 Summer Olympics